Ek Sal Getuig is the third studio album by the pop/opera vocal quartet Romanz and their first Christian-debut album.

Track listing
 "Houtkruis"
 "Ek Sal Getuig"
 "You Raise Me Up (featuring Charlize Berg)"
 "Sweef Soos 'N Arend"
 "Hy'S Die Eerste En Laaste"
 "Bridge Over Troubled Water"
 "When A Child Is Born" 
 "Staan Op En Sing" 
 "Halleluja" 
 "Hier Is My Alles" 
 "From A Distance"
 "U Is Daar" 
 "Gloryland" 
 "Hoe Groot Is U"
 "Jerusalem"

Charts

Certifications

References

External links 
 Official Website

2010 albums
Romanz albums
Gospel albums by South African artists